The Ohio School for the Deaf is a school located in Columbus, Ohio.  It is run by the Ohio Department of Education for deaf and hard-of-hearing students across Ohio.  It was established on October 16, 1829, making it the fifth oldest residential school in the country.  OSD is the only publicly funded residential school for the deaf in Ohio.

The mission of the Ohio School for the Deaf, an educational facility and resource center on deafness, is:

 to provide comprehensive education for Ohio's Deaf and Hard-of-Hearing students which encourages independence and lifelong learning to promote social development and cultural awareness
 to prepare students to attain their potential and become contributing members of their communities
 to collaborate with schools and other educational programs serving Deaf and Hard-of-Hearing students and their families to meet the individual needs of each student
 all via a barrier-free communication environment using American Sign Language (ASL) and English.

Before moving to the school's current location in Clintonville's Beechwold-Sharon Heights area, the school campus was in Downtown Columbus, and was known as the Ohio Institution for the Deaf and Dumb. The school's main building there was demolished in 1981, though another still stands, now used as Cristo Rey Columbus High School.

See also
 Kohs block design test
 Ohio State School for the Blind

References

External links

 

Educational institutions established in 1829
Schools in Columbus, Ohio
Education in Franklin County, Ohio
High schools in Franklin County, Ohio
Public elementary schools in Ohio
Public middle schools in Ohio
Public high  schools in Ohio
Public K-12 schools in the United States
Schools for the deaf in the United States
Public boarding schools in the United States
Clintonville (Columbus, Ohio)